Eriostepta sanguinea is a moth of the family Erebidae. It was described by British entomologist George Hampson in 1905, originally under the genus Araeomolis; Hervé de Toulgoët transferred it to Eriostepta in 1993. It is found in French Guiana, Guyana, Peru, and the Brazilian state of Amazonas.

References

Phaegopterina
Moths of South America
Fauna of the Amazon
Moths described in 1905